The 2002 South Australian state election was held on 9 February 2002.

Retiring Members

Labor
Carolyn Pickles MLC

Liberal
Michael Armitage MHA (Adelaide)
Steve Condous MHA (Colton)
Graham Ingerson MHA (Bragg)
John Olsen MHA (Kavel)
John Oswald MHA (Morphett)
David Wotton MHA (Heysen)
Legh Davis MLC
Trevor Griffin MLC
Jamie Irwin MLC

House of Assembly
Sitting members are shown in bold text. Successful candidates are highlighted in the relevant colour. Where there is possible confusion, an asterisk (*) is also used.

Legislative Council
Sitting members are shown in bold text. Tickets that elected at least one MLC are highlighted in the relevant colour. Successful candidates are identified by an asterisk (*). Eleven seats were up for election. Labor were defending four seats. The Liberals were defending six seats. The Democrats were defending one seat.

2002 elections in Australia
Candidates for South Australian state elections
2000s in South Australia